Although Islam is a minority religion in Russia, Russia has the largest Muslim population in Europe. According to the US Department of State in 2017, Muslims in Russia numbered 14 million or roughly 10% of the total population. The Grand Mufti of Russia, Sheikh Rawil Gaynetdin, estimated the Muslim population of Russia at 25 million in 2018.

Recognized under the law and by Russian political leaders as one of Russia's traditional religions, Islam is a part of Russian historical heritage, and is subsidized by the Russian government. The position of Islam as a major Russian religion, alongside Orthodox Christianity, dates from the time of Catherine the Great, who sponsored Islamic clerics and scholarship through the Orenburg Assembly.

The history of Islam and Russia encompasses periods of conflict between the Muslim minority and the Orthodox majority, as well as periods of collaboration and mutual support. Robert Crews's study of Muslims living under the Tsar indicates that "the mass of Muslims" was loyal to that regime after Catherine, and sided with it over the Ottoman Empire. After the Russian Empire fell, the Soviet Union introduced a policy of state atheism, which impeded the practice of Islam and other religions and led to the execution and suppression of various Muslim leaders. Following the collapse of the Soviet Union, Islam regained a legally recognized space in Russian politics. Despite having made Islamophobic comments during the Second Chechen War, President Vladimir Putin has since subsidized mosques and Islamic education, which he called an "integral part of Russia's cultural code", and encouraged immigration from Muslim-majority former Soviet states.

Muslims form a majority of the population of the republics of Tatarstan and Bashkortostan in the Volga Federal District and predominate among the nationalities in the North Caucasian Federal District located between the Black Sea and the Caspian Sea: the Circassians, Balkars, Chechens, Ingush, Kabardin, Karachay, and numerous Dagestani peoples. Also, in the middle of the Volga Region reside populations of Tatars and Bashkirs, the vast majority of whom are Muslims. Other areas with notable Muslim minorities include Moscow, Saint Petersburg, the republics of Adygea, North Ossetia-Alania and Astrakhan, Moscow, Orenburg and Ulyanovsk oblasts. There are over 5,000 registered religious Muslim organizations, equivalent to over one sixth of the number of registered Russian Orthodox religious organizations of about 29,268 as of December 2006.

History
In the mid-7th century AD, as part of the Muslim conquest of Persia, Islam was introduced to the Caucasus region, parts of which were later permanently incorporated by Russia. The first people to become Muslims within current Russian territory, the Dagestani people (region of Derbent), converted after the Arab conquest of the region in the 8th century. The first Muslim state in the future Russian lands was Volga Bulgaria
(922). The Tatars of the Khanate of Kazan inherited the population of believers from that state. Later most of the European and Caucasian Turkic peoples also became followers of Islam.

The Tatars of the Crimean Khanate, the last remaining successor to the Golden Horde, continued to raid Southern Russia and burnt down parts of Moscow in 1571. Until the late 18th century, the Crimean Tatars maintained a massive slave-trade with the Ottoman Empire and the Middle East, exporting about 2 million slaves from Russia and Ukraine over the period 1500–1700.

From the early 16th century up to including the 19th century, all of Transcaucasia and southern Dagestan was ruled by various successive Iranian empires (the Safavids, Afsharids, and the Qajars), and their geopolitical and ideological neighboring arch-rivals, on the other hand, the Ottoman Turks. In the respective areas they ruled, in both the North Caucasus and South Caucasus, Shia Islam and Sunni Islam spread, resulting in a fast and steady conversion of many more ethnic Caucasian peoples in adjacent territories.

The period from the Russian conquest of Kazan in 1552 by Ivan the Terrible to the ascension of Catherine the Great in 1762 featured systematic Russian repression of Muslims through policies of exclusion and discrimination - as well as the destruction of Muslim culture by the elimination of outward manifestations of Islam such as mosques. The Russians initially demonstrated a willingness in allowing Islam to flourish as Muslim clerics were invited into the various regions to preach to the Muslims, particularly the Kazakhs, whom the Russians viewed with contempt. However, Russian policy shifted toward weakening Islam by introducing pre-Islamic elements of collective consciousness. Such attempts included methods of eulogizing pre-Islamic historical figures and imposing a sense of inferiority by sending Kazakhs to highly élite Russian military institutions. In response, Kazakh religious leaders attempted to bring religious fervor by espousing pan-Turkism, though many were persecuted as a result. The government of Russia paid Islamic scholars from the Ural-Volga area working among the Kazakhs

Islamic slavery did not have racial restrictions. Russian girls were legally allowed to be sold in Russian-controlled Novgorod to Tatars from Kazan in the 1600s by Russian law. Germans, Poles, and Lithuanians were allowed to be sold to Crimean Tatars in Moscow. In 1665 Tatars were allowed to buy Polish and Lithuanian slaves from the Russians. Before 1649 Russians could be sold to Muslims under Russian law in Moscow. This contrasted with other places in Europe outside Russia where Muslims were not allowed to own Christians.

The Cossack Hetmanate recruited and incorporated Muslim Mishar Tatars. Cossack rank was awarded to Bashkirs. Muslim Turkics and Buddhist Kalmyks served as Cossacks. The Cossack Ural, Terek, Astrakhan, and Don Cossack hosts had Kalmyks in their ranks. Mishar Muslims, Teptiar Muslims, service Tatar Muslims, and Bashkir Muslims joined the Orenburg Cossack Host. Cossack non-Muslims shared the same status with Siberian Cossack Muslims. Muslim Cossacks in Siberia requested an Imam. Cossacks in Siberia included Tatar Muslims like in Bashkiria.

Bashkirs and Kalmyks in the Imperial Russian Army fought against Napoleon's Grande Armée during the French invasion of Russia. They were judged suitable for inundating opponents but not intense fighting. They were in a non-standard capacity in the military. Arrows, bows, and melee combat weapons were wielded by the Muslim Bashkirs. Bashkir women fought among the regiments. Denis Davidov mentioned the arrows and bows wielded by the Bashkirs. Napoleon's forces faced off against Kalmyks on horseback. Napoleon faced light mounted Bashkir forces. Mounted Kalmyks and Bashkirs numbering 100 were available to Russian commandants during the war against Napoleon. Kalmyks and Bashkirs served in the Russian army in France. A nachalnik was present in every one of the 11 cantons of the Bashkir host which was created by Russia after the Pugachev Rebellion. Bashkirs had the military statute of 1874 applied to them. Muslims were exempt from military conscription during World War I.

While total expulsion (as practiced in other Christian nations such as Spain, Portugal and Sicily) was not feasible to achieve a homogeneous Russian-Orthodox population, other policies such as land grants and the promotion of migration by other Russian and non-Muslim populations into Muslim lands displaced many Muslims, making them minorities in places such as some parts of the South Ural region and encouraging emigration to other parts such as the Ottoman Empire and neighboring Persia, and almost annihilating the Circassians, Crimean Tatars, and various Muslims of the Caucasus. The Russian army rounded up people, driving Muslims from their villages to ports on the Black Sea, where they awaited ships provided by the neighboring Ottoman Empire. The explicit Russian goal involved expelling the groups in question from their lands. They were given a choice as to where to be resettled: in the Ottoman Empire, in Persia, or Russia far from their old lands. The Russo-Circassian War ended with the signing of loyalty oaths by Circassian leaders on 2 June [O.S. 21 May] 1864. Afterward, the Ottoman Empire offered to harbor the Circassians who did not wish to accept the rule of a Christian monarch, and many emigrated to Anatolia (the heart of the Ottoman Empire) and ended up in modern Turkey, Syria, Jordan, Palestine, Iraq, and Kosovo. Many other Caucasian Muslims ended up in neighboring Iran - sizeable numbers of Shia Lezgins, Azerbaijanis, Muslim Georgians, Kabardins, and Laks.
Various Russian, Caucasus, and Western historians agree on the figure of  500,000 inhabitants of the highland Caucasus being deported by Russia in the 1860s. A large proportion of them died in transit from disease. Those that remained loyal to Russia were settled into the lowlands, on the left bank of the Kuban' River. The trend of Russification has continued at different paces in the rest of Tsarist and Soviet periods, so that   more Tatars lived outside the Republic of Tatarstan than inside it.

A policy of deliberately enforcing anti-modern, traditional, ancient conservative Islamic education in schools and Islamic ideology was enforced by the Russians in order to deliberately hamper and destroy opposition to their rule by keeping them in a state of torpor to and prevent foreign ideologies from penetrating in.

Communist rule oppressed and suppressed Islam, like other religions in the Soviet Union. Many mosques (for some estimates, more than 83% in Tatarstan) were closed. For example, the Märcani Mosque was the only acting mosque in Kazan at that time.

Islam in the post-Soviet period

There was much evidence of official conciliation toward Islam in Russia in the 1990s. The number of Muslims allowed to make pilgrimages to Mecca increased sharply after the embargo of the Soviet era ended in 1991. In 1995 the newly established Union of Muslims of Russia, led by Imam Khatyb Mukaddas of Tatarstan, began organizing a movement aimed at improving inter-ethnic understanding and ending Russians' lingering misconception of Islam. The Union of Muslims of Russia is the direct successor to the pre-World War I Union of Muslims, which had its own faction in the Russian Duma. The post-Communist union formed a political party, the Nur All-Russia Muslim Public Movement, which acts in close coordination with Muslim imams to defend the political, economic, and cultural rights of Muslims. The Islamic Cultural Center of Russia, which includes a madrassa (religious school), opened in Moscow in 1991. In the 1990s, the number of Islamic publications has increased. Among them are few magazines in Russian, namely: "Ислам" (transliteration: Islam), "Эхо Кавказа" (Ekho Kavkaza) and "Исламский вестник" (Islamsky Vestnik), and the Russian-language newspaper "Ассалам" (Assalam), and "Нуруль Ислам" (Nurul Islam), which are published in Makhachkala, Dagestan.

Kazan has a large Muslim population (probably the second after Moscow urban group of the Muslims and the biggest indigenous group in Russia) and is home to the Russian Islamic University in Kazan, Tatarstan. Education is in Russian and Tatar.
In Dagestan there are number of Islamic universities and madrassas, notable among them are: Dagestan Islamic University, Institute of Theology and International Relations, whose rector Maksud Sadikov was assassinated on 8 June 2011.

Talgat Tadzhuddin was the Chief Mufti of Russia. Since Soviet times, the Russian government has divided Russia into a number of Muslim Spiritual Directorates. In 1980 Tazhuddin was made Mufti of the European USSR and Siberia Division. Since 1992 he has headed the central or combined Muslim Spiritual Directorate of all of Russia.

Russian president Vladimir Putin has said that Orthodox Christianity is much closer to Islam than Catholicism is.

A chain e-mail spread a hoax speech attributed to Putin which called for tough assimilation policies on immigrants, no evidence of any such speech can be found in Russian media or Duma archives.

Islam has been expanding under Putin's rule. Tatar Muslims are engaging in a revival under Putin.

According to The Washington Post, "Russian Muslims are split regarding the [Russian] intervention in Syria, but more are pro- than anti-war."

Islam in the North Caucasus
In the late 1980s and early 1990s, the Northern Caucasus experienced an Islamic (as well as a national) renaissance. Also radical and extremist streams of Islam started taking root, initially in western (upland) Dagestan. 

In 1991, Chechnya declared independence as the Chechen Republic of Ichkeria. Russian Army forces were commanded into Grozny in 1994, but, after two years of intense fighting, the Russian troops eventually withdrew from Chechnya under the Khasavyurt Accord. Chechnya preserved its de facto independence until 1999. However, the Chechen government's grip on Chechnya was weak, especially outside the ruined capital Grozny. The areas controlled by separatist groups grew larger and the country became increasingly lawless. Aslan Maskhadov's government was unable to rebuild the region or to prevent a number of warlords from taking effective control. The relationship between the government and radicals deteriorated. In March 1999, Maskhadov closed down the Chechen parliament and introduced aspects of Sharia. Despite this concession, extremists such as Shamil Basayev and the Saudi-born Islamist Ibn Al-Khattab continued to undermine the Maskhadov government. In April 1998, the group publicly declared that its long-term aim was the creation of a union of Chechnya and Dagestan under Islamic rule and the expulsion of Russians from the entire Caucasian Region. This eventually led to the invasion of militants in Dagestan and the start of the Second Chechen War in 1999. The Chechen separatists were internally divided between the Islamic extremists, the more moderate pro-independent Muslim Chechens and the traditional Islamic authorities with various positions towards Chechen independence. An interim Russian-controlled administration was imposed in Chechnya in 2000, headed by the ex-Mufti and, therefore, religious leader of Sufism, Akhmad Kadyrov. Encouraged by the Russian strategy of using the traditional Islamic structures and leaders against the Islamic extremists, there was a process of religious radicalisation in Chechnya and other Northern Caucasus regions. 

At the end of the Second Chechen War, in 2005, Chechen rebel leader, Abdul-Halim Sadulayev, decreed the formation of a Caucasus Front against Russia, among Islamic believers in the North Caucasus, in an attempt to widen Chechnya's conflict with Russia. After his death, his successor, Dokka Umarov, declared continuing jihad to establish an Islamic fundamentalist Caucasus Emirate in the North Caucasus and beyond. Insurgency in the North Caucasus continued until 2017. The police and the FSB carried out mass arrests and used harsh interrogation techniques. Some of those who closely followed the teachings of Islam have lost their jobs; mosques have also been closed. 

Russian president Vladimir Putin has allowed the de facto implementation of Sharia law in Chechnya by Ramzan Kadyrov, including polygamy and enforced veiling.

There was large anger from mostly Muslims from the Caucasus against the Charlie Hebdo cartoons in France. Putin is believed to have backed protests by Muslims in Russia against Charlie Hebdo cartoons and the West.

Demographics

More than 90% of Muslims in Russia adhere to the Sunni Islam. About 10% or more than two million are Shia Muslims. There is also an active presence of Ahmadis. In a few areas, notably Dagestan and Chechnya, there is a tradition of Sunni Sufism, which is represented by Naqshbandi and Shadhili schools, whose spiritual master Said Afandi al-Chirkawi received hundreds of visitors daily. The Azeris have also historically and still currently been nominally followers of Shi'a Islam, as their republic split off from the Soviet Union, significant number of Azeris immigrated to Russia in search of work.

In 2021 Putin announced that some 20% of Russian aviation industry employees are Muslims.

Hajj
A record 18,000 Russian Muslim pilgrims from all over the country attended the Hajj in Mecca, Saudi Arabia in 2006. In 2010, at least 20,000 Russian Muslim pilgrims attended the Hajj, as Russian Muslim leaders sent letters to the King of Saudi Arabia requesting that the Saudi visa quota be raised to at least 25,000–28,000 visas for Muslims. Due to overwhelming demand from Russian Muslims, on 5 July 2011, Muftis requested President Dmitry Medvedev's assistance in increasing the allocated by Saudi Arabia pilgrimage quota in Vladikavkaz. The III International Conference on Hajj Management attended by some 170 delegates from 12 counties was held in Kazan from 7 – 9 July 2011.

Language controversies
For centuries, the Tatars constituted the only Muslim ethnic group in European Russia, with Tatar language being the only language used in their mosques, a situation which saw rapid change over the course of the 20th century as a large number of Caucasian and Central Asian Muslims migrated to central Russian cities and began attending Tatar-speaking mosques, generating pressure on the imams of such mosques to begin using Russian. This problem is evident even within Tatarstan itself, where Tatars constitute a majority.

Public perception of Muslims
A survey published in 2019 by the Pew Research Center found that 76% of Russians had a favourable view of Muslims in their country, whereas 19% had an unfavourable view.

Islam in Russia by region 

Percentage of Muslims in Russia by region:

Islam in Moscow
According to the 2010 Russian census, Moscow has less than 300,000 permanent residents of Muslim background, while some estimates suggest that Moscow has around 1 million Muslim residents and up to 1.5 million more Muslim migrant workers. The city has permitted the existence of four mosques. The mayor of Moscow claims that four mosques are sufficient for the population. The city's economy "could not manage without them," he said. There are currently 4 mosques in Moscow, and 8,000 in the whole of Russia. Muslim migrants from Central Asia have had an impact on the culture with Samsa becoming one of the most popular take away foods in the city.

Gallery

Notable Muslims

 Alexander Litvinenko was a defector from Russian intelligence, who converted on his deathbed.
 Khabib Nurmagomedov is a former professional mixed martial artist.
 Islam Makhachev is a professional mixed martial artist. 
 Usman Nurmagomedov is a professional mixed martial artist.
 Umar Nurmagomedov is a professional mixed martial artist. 
 Vladimir Khodov was a terrorist involved in the Beslan school hostage crisis.
 Rudolf Nureyev was considered the greatest male ballet dancer of his generation. 
 Vyacheslav Polosin was a former Russian Orthodox Church priest who was at the forefront of a campaign to make Orthodox Christmas a public holiday in Russia and converted to Islam in 1999.
 Alina Zagitova is a figure skater.
 Shamil Musaev is a freestyle wrestler.
 Movlid Khaybulaev is a professional mixed martial artist.
 Movsar Evloev is a mixed martial artist, who is currently competing in the featherweight division of the UFC. A professional since 2014, he has also competed at 1 Global, where he is the former bantamweight.
 Imam Shamil was a political leader and Imam ofDagestan, who resisted against Russian expansion of the Caucasus.
 Ramazan Ramazanov is a kickboxer.

See also

 Islam in Europe
 Islam by country
 Islam in the Soviet Union
 Islam in Tatarstan
 List of mosques in Russia
 Religion in Russia
 Islam in Bangladesh
 Islam in China
 Islam in Indonesia
 Islam in Iran
 Islam in Nigeria
 Islam in Pakistan
 Islam in the Philippines

References

External links
 Kurbanov, Ruslan. Reasons and Consequences: Banning Hadiths and Seerah in Russia, onislam.net
 islam.ru 
 History of Hajj in Russia from 18th to 21st century
 Why Islam?
 Akhmetova, Elmira. Islam in Russia (History & Facts), onislam.net
 Chris Kutschera - "The Rebirth of Islam in Tatarstan"
 Russian Islam Comes Out into the Open The Moscow News
 Russia has a Muslim dilemma Ethnic Russians hostile to Muslims
 Islam in Russia
 Russian mosques
 Moscow's Mosque Problem - slideshow by Der Spiegel
 Akhmetova, Elmira. Islam in the Volga Region, onislam.net
 Sotnichenko, Alexander Islam, Russian Orthodox Church Relations and the State in Post-communist Russia Politics and Religion Journal
 What is it like to be a Muslim in Russia?
 Central Muslim Spiritual Board of Russia - official website 
 Russia Mufties Council - official website

 
Religion in Russia